Kolanı (also known as Kelanly) is a village in the municipality of Kövər in the Yevlakh Rayon of Azerbaijan.

References
 

Populated places in Yevlakh District